The ventral posterolateral nucleus (VPL) is a nucleus of the thalamus. Together with the ventral posteromedial nucleus (VPM), ventral posterior inferior nucleus (VPI) and ventromedial posterior nucleus (VMpo), it constitutes the ventral posterior nucleus. There is uncertainty in the location of VMpo, as determined by spinothalamic tract (STT) terminations and staining for calcium-binding proteins, and several authorities do not consider its existence as being proved. 

The nucleus ventralis posterior lateralis pars oralis (VPLo) is a subdivision of the ventral posterolateral thalamus which has substantial projections to the motor cortex.

Input and output
The VPL receives information from the neospinothalamic tract and the medial lemniscus of the posterior column-medial lemniscus pathway.  It then projects this sensory information to Brodmann's Areas 3, 1 and 2 in the postcentral gyrus.  Collectively, Brodmann areas 3, 1 and 2 make up the primary somatosensory cortex of the brain.

Additional images

See also 
 Nucleus ventralis posterior lateralis pars oralis

References

Thalamus